Book of the Dead is an original novel based on the U.S. television series Angel, written by and published by Pocket Books.  It was first published in 2004.

Plot summary
Wes has loved books since childhood. When a former colleague, Adrian O'Flaherty, arrives in town and invites him to a secret auction of rare occult books, Wes immediately agrees.

However Adrian wants more than dusty old books at the auction. He wants revenge. Before the Watchers' Council was blown up (seen in 'Never Leave Me'), Rutherford Sirk took a number of rare books from the Council's libraries and killed the librarian who was Adrian's father.

Wes buys a number of old books at the auction including one of the most famous books of magick, The Red Compendium, which is infamous for absorbing those who read it. Wes has always been a sucker for literature and soon finds he can't put it down even if he wants to.

Continuity

Supposed to be set in Angel Season 4, after Buffy episode "Never Leave Me".
Characters include: Angel, Cordelia, Wesley, Gunn, Fred, and Lorne.

Canonical issues

Angel books such as this one are not usually considered by fans as canonical. Some fans consider them stories from the imaginations of authors and artists, while other fans consider them as taking place in an alternative fictional reality. However unlike fan fiction, overviews summarising their story, written early in the writing process, were 'approved' by both Fox and Joss Whedon (or his office), and the books were therefore later published as officially Buffy/Angel merchandise.

External links

Reviews
Teen-books.com - Reviews of this book

2004 American novels
2004 fantasy novels
Angel (1999 TV series) novels
Pocket Books books